Otto L. Olen was a member of the Wisconsin State Assembly. He was born in 1867 and died in 1946.

Biography
Olen was born in Winneconne (town), Wisconsin in 1875. Professions he held include schoolteacher before opening a law practice in Manawa, Wisconsin. In 1911, he moved to Clintonville, Wisconsin.

Political career
Olen was elected to the Assembly in 1906 and 1910. Additionally, he was vice-chairman of the county board of Waupaca County, Wisconsin. He was a Republican.

References

People from Clintonville, Wisconsin
Republican Party members of the Wisconsin State Assembly
Wisconsin lawyers
Schoolteachers from Wisconsin
1867 births
1946 deaths
People from Winneconne, Wisconsin
People from Manawa, Wisconsin